Malachi Dupre (born October 12, 1995) is an  American football wide receiver. He played college football at Louisiana State University (LSU). He was drafted by the Green Bay Packers in the seventh round of the 2017 NFL Draft.

Early years
Dupre attended John Curtis Christian High School in River Ridge, Louisiana. As a senior, he recorded 34 receptions for 607 yards and six touchdowns and as a junior he had 36 receptions for 816 yards and 15 touchdowns. Dupre was rated as a five-star recruit and was either ranked as the first or second best receiver in his class by numerous scouting outlets. He committed to Louisiana State University (LSU) to play college football.

College career
Dupre played in 12 games and made two starts as a true freshman at LSU in 2014. He finished the year with 14 receptions for 318 yards and five touchdowns. As a sophomore in 2015, Dupre played 12 games with 698 receiving yards and six touchdowns. As a junior in 2016, Dupre played 11 games with 593 receiving yards and three touchdowns. After the season, Dupre decided to forgo his senior year and enter the 2017 NFL Draft.

Professional career

Green Bay Packers
The Green Bay Packers selected Dupre in the seventh round (247th overall) of the 2017 NFL Draft. He was the 32nd and final wide receiver selected in 2017.

On May 5, 2017, the Green Bay Packers signed Dupre to a four-year, $2.46 million contract that includes a signing bonus of $66,636. He was waived by the Packers on September 2, 2017.

Buffalo Bills
On September 12, 2017, Dupre was signed to the Buffalo Bills' practice squad. He was promoted to the active roster on December 26, 2017. He was released on September 1, 2018.

Houston Texans
On September 12, 2018, Dupre was signed to the Houston Texans' practice squad. He was released on September 18, 2018, but was re-signed a week later. He was released on November 12, 2018.

Seattle Seahawks
On November 20, 2018, Dupre was signed to the Seattle Seahawks practice squad, but was released a week later.

Arizona Cardinals
On December 5, 2018, Dupre was signed to the Arizona Cardinals practice squad. He was promoted to the active roster on December 28, 2018. He was waived on May 22, 2019.

Los Angeles Chargers
On July 28, 2019, Dupre signed with the Los Angeles Chargers. He was waived on August 31, 2019.

DC Defenders 
Dupree was selected by the DC Defenders in the supplemental draft of the 2020 XFL Draft. He had his contract terminated when the league suspended operations on April 10, 2020.

References

External links
LSU Tigers bio

1995 births
Living people
Players of American football from New Orleans
American football wide receivers
LSU Tigers football players
Green Bay Packers players
Buffalo Bills players
Houston Texans players
Seattle Seahawks players
Arizona Cardinals players
Los Angeles Chargers players
DC Defenders players